DeVos Place Convention Center, erected on the Grand River in downtown Grand Rapids, Michigan, is a multi-purpose convention center. It is named for Richard DeVos, who donated $20 million towards its construction.

The convention center contains a large, 162,000 square foot exhibit hall and an additional 40,000 square foot ballroom.

The convention center is owned by the Grand Rapids-Kent County Convention/Arena Authority and managed by SMG.

DeVos Performance Hall

The DeVos Performance Hall is a 2,404-seat theater located on the south side of the building. It was built in 1980 and is home to the Grand Rapids Symphony and Broadway Grand Rapids. It can also serve as a space for a general session or keynote address.

DeVos Performance Hall has hosted concerts by artists such as B.B. King, Barenaked Ladies, James Taylor, Tori Amos, Eddie Money, Sammy Hagar Harry Connick, Jr., and Ne-yo comedians such as Jerry Seinfeld, Bill Cosby, Daniel Middleton and Ron White; and family shows including Dora The Explorer Live, Bear in The Big Blue House Live, Blue's Clues Live and Thomas & Friends Live.  Eddie Money has traditionally kicked off DeVos Performance Hall's summer concert schedule every year in recent decades.

The new lobby of DeVos Performance Hall was unveiled in June 2002 as part of the DeVos Place Expansion project.  The renovated lobby includes a beautiful terrazzo floor, new box office with an outside window and a scrolling marquee. Also part of the renovations were new restroom facilities located on the north side of the theater on the second and third floors. 
 
Internal renovations include refurbished theater seating, as well as new wall and ceiling finishes, new flooring and enhanced colored accent lighting to refresh the house interior and adjoining entry paths. New balcony light fixtures were added along with freshly redesigned balcony fronts that improved sight lines.

Welsh Auditorium
The Welsh Auditorium facade remains from the original structure, which faces the Amway Grand Plaza Hotel.

Grand River Promenade
The Grand River Promenade, the official name for the skyway, goes between the DeVos Place Convention Center and the Van Andel Arena.

References

External links
 Official website
 DeVos Performance Hall

Buildings and structures in Grand Rapids, Michigan
Economy of Grand Rapids, Michigan
Convention centers in Michigan
Tourist attractions in Grand Rapids, Michigan
Event venues established in 2003
Concert halls in Michigan